Suggs Peak is a small ice-covered peak 6 nautical miles (11 km) south-southwest of Mount Wilbanks in the Kohler Range, Marie Byrd Land, Antarctica. Mapped by United States Geological Survey (USGS) from surveys and U.S. Navy air photos 1959–66. Named by Advisory Committee on Antarctic Names (US-ACAN) for James D. Suggs, United States Antarctic Research Program (USARP) geologist with the Marie Byrd Land Survey Party, 1966–67.

Mountains of Marie Byrd Land